Villasanta Parco railway station is a railway station in Italy. Located on the Monza–Molteno railway, it serves the municipality of Villasanta in Lombardy. The train services are operated by Trenord. The original name was La Santa-Villa San Fiorano.

Until 11 December 2022 it was called "Villasanta".

Train services 
The station is served by the following service(s):

Milan Metropolitan services (S7) Milan - Molteno - Lecco

See also 
 Milan suburban railway network

References 

Railway stations in Lombardy
Milan S Lines stations
Railway stations opened in 1911